Berhampur is a Lok Sabha parliamentary constituency in Odisha.

Assembly Segments

Members of Parliament
2019: Chandra Sekhar Sahu, BJD
2014: Siddhanta Mahapatra, BJD
2009: Siddhanta Mahapatra, BJD
2004: Chandra Sekhar Sahu, Congress
1999: Anadi Charan Sahu, BJP
1998: Jayanti Patnaik, Congress
1996: P. V. Narasimha Rao, Congress
1991: Gopinath Gajapati, Congress
1989: Gopinath Gajapati, Congress
1984: Jagannath Rao, Congress
1980: Jagannath Rao, Congress
1977: Jagannath Rao, Congress
1971: Jagannath Rao, Congress (as Chatrapur seat)
1967: Jagannath Rao, Congress (as Chatrapur seat)
1962: Ananta Tripathi Sarma, Congress (as Chatrapur seat)
1957: Mohan Nayak, Congress (as Ganjam seat) 
1957: Uma Charan Patnaik (Independent) (as Ganjam )
1952: Bijay Chandra Das (CPI)(as Ganjam seat)
1952: Uma Charan Patnaik, Independent (as Ghumsur seat )

Election results

2019 Election Result

2014 Election Results
In 2014 election, Biju Janata Dal candidate Siddhanta Mohapatra defeated Indian National Congress candidate Chandra Sekhar Sahu by a margin of 1,27,720 votes.

General Election 2009

References

External links
Berhampur lok sabha  constituency election 2019 date and schedule

Lok Sabha constituencies in Odisha
Gajapati district
Politics of Ganjam district